Cechenena scotti is a moth of the  family Sphingidae. It is known from India, Nepal and Vietnam.

It is similar to Cechenena lineosa, but there is pink dorsal scaling on the antenna and there is an olive-green band running along the costa that contrasts strongly with the almost white ground colour of the remainder of the wing, which is flushed pink basally.

References

Cechenena
Moths described in 1920